Bashiqah Mountain  also known as Ba'ashiqah is a mountain North east of Mosul, Iraq, east of Khorsabad and nearby Bashiqa township and near Ain Sifni  in Northern Iraq. 

The mountain is located behind Bashiqah township, is 359 km north of Baghdad in Ninawa Province, and located at 36,4531n and 43,3478e. It is 326 above sea level.

The mountain became a strategic point following the Fall of Mosul but was retaken with the recapture of Mosul in 2017. The hill  was heavily fortified by ISIS. The mountain has since been taken by Kurdish forces.

Climate
The climate is Csa under the Köppen-Geiger system, average temperature in Bashiqah is 19.5°C and the average annual rainfall is 572 mm.

References

Mountains of Iraq